Kutter may refer to:

People
Notable people with this surname include:
 Anton Kutter (1903–1985), German film director and inventor
 Édouard Kutter Jr. (born 1934), photographer from Luxembourg
 Édouard Kutter Sr. (1887–1978), photographer from Luxembourg
 Eneli Kutter (born 1991), Estonian footballer
 Friedrich Kutter (1834–1891), German physician and ornithologist
 Hermann Kutter (1863–1931), Swiss Lutheran theologian
 Joseph Kutter (1894–1941), painter from Luxembourg
 Paul Kutter (1863–1937), Swiss-Luxembourgian photographer

Notable people with this given name include:
 Kutter Crawford (born 1996), American baseball player

Other uses
 Keen Kutter, a trade name first used by Simmons Hardware Company of St. Louis, Missouri in 1866
 Keen Kutter Building, in Wichita, Kansas
 Krud Kutter, a trade name now owned by Rust-Oleum

See also
 Cutter (disambiguation)
 Kotter (disambiguation)